The Berlin Half Marathon is a major endurance event held annually in early spring in Berlin, Germany. Besides the runner's main race, the event includes a race for inline skaters, wheelchair athletes and handbikers. All athletes use the same course, which has the official half marathon distance of 21.0975 km.

The half marathon and the Berlin Marathon are hosted by the club SCC Berlin and organized by SCC EVENTS.  The half marathon is categorized as a Bronze Label Road Race by World Athletics.

History
The story of the Berlin half marathon reflects a major part of the history of the German capital. Its predecessors came from East and West Berlin. The race, as it exists today, arose in 1990 from the Berliner Friedenslauf (Berlin Peace Run) which took place in East Berlin since 1982 and the SCC Half Marathon in the western part of the city. 

The Berliner Friedenslauf covered various distances, among others a 20-kilometre race and a marathon. The event was established by the government of the GDR and served not only as a sporting event but also as an important propaganda tool.
The SCC Half Marathon on the other side had local character and was designed to be the final test in preparation for the Berlin marathon, which took place four weeks later. 

After the fall of the Berlin Wall in 1989 and the ensuing collapse of the GDR, the support for the Berliner Friedenslauf also diminished. So the former organizer Stefan Senkel quickly had to find a new partner to save the race. SCC-RUNNING, the organizer of the Berlin marathon, joined. Both parties agreed on one distance: a half marathon.  Thus, there is only one major half marathon in Berlin since 1990.

Over the years the Berlin half marathon increased in size and popularity. Today it is by far the biggest half marathon race in Germany, with a record 36,000 participants in 2018.

The 40th anniversary of the Generali Berlin half marathon, which was planned to be held on April 5, 2020, was announced cancelled on 12 March. The decision came from the Berlin authorities as a response to the COVID-19 outbreak.

Course records

Running
Men: 0:58:42, Eric Kiptanui, 2018
Women: 1:05:46, Sifan Hassan, 2019

Inline Skating
Men: 0:30:11, Ewen Fernandez, 2017
Women: 0:36:22, Jana Gegner, 2005

Wheelchair
Men: 0:55:54, Tomasz Hamerlak, 1997
Women: 0:56:54, Yvonne Sehmisch, 2007

Handbike
Men: 0:32:47, Olaf Heine, 2016
Women: 0:38:40, Christiane Reppe, 2014

Past winners

Running

Half Marathon

Berlin Peace Run (20 kilometer)

Inline Skating

References

List of winners
Berlin Half Marathon. Association of Road Racing Statisticians (2011-04-04). Retrieved on 2011-04-09.

External links 
 

Half marathons in Germany
Sports competitions in Berlin
Athletics in Berlin
Inline speed skating competitions